This list contains Taipei Joint Bus System routes both joint or union and county controlled, and also includes routes operated by bus companies that are entrusted by basic level units of the Taipei City Government and the New Taipei City Government and other for-profit enterprises.

This list uses mostly Hanyu pinyin spelling system but also Tongyongm, Wade–Giles systems can be seen throughout the English naming, therefore townships, districts, street signs, buses and bus stops themselves may use other pinyin systems, while the government has made strides to use same spellings, different spellings can still be found, i.e. Zhonghe (中和), is spell as "Jungho" or similar and many of vary spelling be written as such in New Taipei City.

Explanation：
 Joint Bus：Taipei Joint Bus System
 New Taipei：New Taipei City controlled urban buses

General routes of below two digit

0 - 99

Recreational Bus Routes

108 - 132

General bus route of three digits

201 - 299

300 - 311

505 - 553

600 - 688

701 - 711

801 - 848

Express Bus Routes

902 - 929

※一部分己經不是快速bus

Trunk Line bus routes (Numbered by text)

MRT ShuttleBus Routes

Brown Line Shuttle bus

Red Line Shuttle bus

Orange Line Shuttle bus

Green Line Shuttle bus

Blue Line Shuttle bus

Small bus routes

Citizens’ minibus routes
(市民小巴)

Theme bus routes

Parks Commuters Bus Routes

Neihu Technology Park

Nangang Software Park

Free Bus Routes

New Taipei City New Bu S
:zh:新北市新巴士, Xin Bei Shi Xin Ba Shi

便民routes

Other Routes

See also
 List of bus routes in Taichung

External links
悠遊網-Keelung、Taipei公車資訊
暢行Taipei-公車客運資訊 Station
Taipei公車動態資訊E-BUS
我愛巴士5284(TaipeiTaipei City Hall )
Taiwan Tour Bus 台灣觀光巴士

Transportation in Taipei
Taipei
Transportation in New Taipei